Aiteo Group is an integrated, global-focused Nigerian energy conglomerate founded in February 2008. The company is the successor entity to Sigmund Communnecci Limited.  The company focuses in oil and gas exploration and production; bulk petroleum storage; refining of petroleum products; trading, marketing and supply as well as power generation and distribution.

History

Sigmund Communecci, founded in 1999, was a petroleum products supply and trading company. It owned and operated a petroleum storage terminal in Abonemma Wharf. To fully explore growing business opportunities in the petroleum upstream sector in Nigeria, In February 2008, Sigmund Communecci was restructured, re-positioned and re-branded to ensure it sustainably builds the capacity to diversify globally, attract and nurture top talent, leveraging on strategic alliances and technology.

Operations

Downstream

Aiteo owns and operates petroleum storage facilities in Lagos and Port Harcourt. including the Abonnema Storage Terminal (“Port Harcourt Tank Farm”), with total capacity of over 110 Million Liters. It constructed a jetty to accommodate growing vessel traffic to the Port Harcourt Terminal, which accommodates up to 30,000 metric tons dead weight. In the first quarter of 2011, Aiteo was one of the 32 companies issued permits to import petrol, under the Refined Products Exchange Agreement. Aiteo Group was among the Nigerian companies awarded oil lifting contracts, in the Federal Government's bid, through the Nigerian National Petroleum Corporation, to award nearly half of 2012/2013 oil lifting contracts worth $40 billion  to indigenous companies and in the process, promoting local content on one hand and "downsizing contracts awarded to international oil traders. In its own right and also at the request of Duke Oil, the company entered into a Management and Operation Agreement with Duke Oil ”to operate and manage its Crude and Product Exchange Agreement" with NNPC and Pipelines Product Marketing Company (PPMC) from February 2011; an operation which lasted until December 2014. These were landmark transactions in the Nigerian Oil sector.

Upstream

'Aiteo is one of the indigenous Nigerian companies that took advantage of the exit of major international oil companies, like Chevron, ConocoPhillips and Shell that put up their Nigerian onshore licences for sale. In 2014, Aiteo bid for and acquired Shell’s OML29 and Nembe Creek Trunk Line for $2.7 billion. With its acquisition of Royal Dutch Shell Plc's 30% stake as well as Total SA of France and Eni of Italy minority stake in OML29 and the Nembe Creek Trunk Line, Aiteo holds the controlling 45% stake in both assets, for which it paid $569 million for Total SA's stake.

OML 29 includes Nembe, Santa Barbara and Okoraba oil fields. According to Shell, "combined production averaged around 43,000 barrels per day of oil equivalent in 2014". "Oil and gas industry investment analysts says Aiteo Group’s investment is a demonstration of its commitment to the continuous growth and development of the country’s oil and gas sector in accordance with the law enacted in April 2010".. Aiteo holds a controlling equity stake holding of 85% in the consortium that acquired OML29. The other members of the consortium include Tempo Energy Resources  10% and Taleveras  5%.

Power generation

Aiteo's interest in the power sector is operated through its subsidiary; Aiteo Power and Gas which has Dr. Ransom Owan as its Group Managing Director. Dr. Owan was the pioneer Chairman & Chief Executive Officer (CEO) of the Nigerian Electricity Regulatory Commission (NERC).

An Aiteo led consortium was the sole bidder for the Alaoji Power Plant . It won the bid with a $902 million fresh bid, after its first bid did not meet the plant's reserved price. Having made a bid of $312.5 million, Aiteo was the reserve bidder. and was shortlisted for the following plants: Egbema Generation Company, Olorunsogo Generation Company and Omoku Generation Company. The same consortium became the preferred bidder for Benin and Calabar Generation Company's, with a bid of $580 million and $625 million respectively. Aiteo holds leading interest in the consortium that won the bids to acquire the following power generation plants in Nigeria:
 Benin Generation Company  preferred bidder with a bid of $580,000,000.00
 Calabar Generation Company  preferred bidder with a bid of $580,000,000.00

Sponsorship

In April 2017, Aiteo Group announced the signing of a 5-Year partnership agreement with the Nigeria Football Federation worth an estimated N2.9b. In the capacity of Official Optimum Partner of the NFF, Aiteo's support funded the salaries of Super Eagles manager Gernot Rohr and coaches of all NFF’s national teams.

References

Oil and gas companies of Nigeria
Companies based in Lagos